When We Were Twenty-One is a 1915 American silent comedy film directed by Hugh Ford and Edwin S. Porter and written by H.V. Esmond. The film stars William Elliott, Charles Waldron, Marie Empress, Helen Lutrell, Winifred Allen, and Arthur Hoops. The film was released on April 5, 1915, by Paramount Pictures.

Plot

Cast  
William Elliott as Richard Audaine
Charles Waldron as Dick Carew
Marie Empress as The Firefly
Helen Lutrell as Phyllis
Winifred Allen as Peggy
Arthur Hoops as The Trinity
Charles Coleman as The Trinity
George Backus as The Trinity
Mrs. Gordon as Mrs. Ericson

References

External links 
 

1915 films
1910s English-language films
Silent American comedy films
1915 comedy films
Paramount Pictures films
Films directed by Hugh Ford
Films directed by Edwin S. Porter
American black-and-white films
American silent feature films
1910s American films